Michał Jach (born 23 September 1951 in Łomża) is a Polish politician. He was elected to the Sejm on 25 September 2005, getting 5,724 votes in 41 Szczecin district as a candidate from the Law and Justice list.

See also
Members of Polish Sejm 2005–2007

External links
Michał Jach – parliamentary page – includes declarations of interest, voting record, and transcripts of speeches.

1951 births
Living people
People from Łomża
Law and Justice politicians
Members of the Polish Sejm 2005–2007
Members of the Polish Sejm 2011–2015
Members of the Polish Sejm 2015–2019
Members of the Polish Sejm 2019–2023
University of Szczecin alumni